Johor Bahru Football Association  (or simply known as JBFA) is a Malaysian association football club based in Johor Bahru, Johor that currently plays in the Malaysia M3 League the third-tier division in Malaysian  football.

The club represents the city of Johor Bahru in football tournaments. The team has traditionally worn a blue home kit.

They play their home matches at the 6,000 capacity Educity Stadium in Nusajaya.

Season by season record
Updated on 26 November 2019.

Honours

Domestic competitions

League 
 Sultan Johor Cup
  Winners (1) : 2018

References

External links
Official Facebook Page

Malaysia M3 League
Football clubs in Malaysia
Football associations in Malaysia
Sport in Johor